Tiger Heart is a 1996 American action film directed by Georges Chamchoum and starring Ted Jan Roberts.

Premise 
A martial arts expert takes on a gang of criminals.

Cast 
Ted Jan Roberts as Eric
Carol Potter as Cynthia
Jennifer Lyons as Stephanie
Robert LaSardo as Paulo
Rance Howard as Mr. Johnson
Timothy Williams as Brad
David Michael as Bobby
Brian Gross as Steve
Vincent DePalma as Manny
Christopher Kriesa as Nat
Gene Armor as Randolph
Elena Sahagun as Chi-Chi
Diane Klimaszewski as Amy
Elaine Klimaszewski as Amanda
Lorissa McComas as Jill
Art Camacho as Sensei
Frank Bruynbroek as Cyril
George Calil as Jack
Gary Bullock as Brad's Father
Albert Garcia as Ferret
Jhoanna Trias as Billie
Ron Yuan as Johnny
Caroline Kim as Exchange Student
Timothy D. Baker as Cop
Denney Pierce as Drunk
Chris S. Koga as Thug #1
Randall Shiro Ideishi as Thug #2
Chester E. Tripp III as Thug #3
Tim Sitarz as Bouncer
Cole S. McKay as Punk
Rob King as Punk
Richard Humphreys as Punk
Paul Allen as Karate Student

Soundtrack 
Derol Caraco - "Tiger Heart" (Written by John Gonzalez)
Cynthia Manly - "We Like Crushin' You"  (Written by John Gonzalez)
Pattie Kelly - "Constant Conflict" (Written by John Gonzalez)

References

External links 

1996 films
American action adventure films
1990s action adventure films
1990s English-language films
1990s American films